François Missoffe (13 October 1919 in Toulon, France – 28 August 2003 in Rouen) was a French politician and diplomat. He was Minister of Youth Affairs and Sport ("Ministre de la Jeunesse et des Sports") in the Government of France between 8 January 1966 and 30 May 1968.

He played a minor role in the run-up to events of May 1968 in France. On 8 January 1968, Missoffe was forced by students at the Paris West University Nanterre La Défense to abandon the inauguration of a campus swimming pool. He was interrupted while making his speech at the occasion by student leader, Daniel Cohn-Bendit in order to demand free access to the girls' dormitory.

Missoffe was Ambassador to Japan from 1964 to 1966.

References

1919 births
2003 deaths
Government ministers of France
20th-century French politicians
Ambassadors of France to Japan